Rose Mutonyi Masaaba also known as Rose Mutonyi is a Ugandan teacher, and politician who has been the Manafwa District Bubulo County West woman representative, a position she has held since 2016. She is affiliated to the National Resistance Movement political party.

Background and education 
She was born on 20 August 1949.  Rose Mutonyi Masaaba attended Nyondo Junior Secondary School for her high school education 1964.

In 1968 she graduated as a teacher with a Grade II Teacher with Certificate in 1974 rose graduated as a Grade III teacher with a Grade III Teachers Certificate in 1979. Rose attained a Diploma in Education and later in 1986, she attained a bachelor's degree of Arts and finally in 1997 she graduated with a Master of Education at Makerere University and all these qualifications were consistently obtained at Makerere University in different year intervals.

Work experience 

Mutonyi once served as counsel and accounting officer at Uganda's foreign missions in New Delhi and Dar es Salaam. Her political office is at Sibanga Sub County in Sibanga Trading Center.

Parliamentary duties 
Besides her duties as speaker of the Ugandan Parliament, she sits on the following parliamentary committees:

 Committee on Foreign Affairs as the  Chairperson.
 Business  Committee, Member.
 Committee on Science and Technology, Member.

Personal life 
She is a Catholic by faith.

See also 

 Parliament of Uganda
 Member of Parliament
 Manafwa District
List of members of the tenth Parliament of Uganda

References

External links 

 Website of the Parliament of Uganda
 http://uwopa.or.ug/page/uwopa-round-table-committees

1949 births
Living people
Speakers of the Parliament of Uganda
21st-century Ugandan women politicians
21st-century Ugandan politicians
Women legislative speakers